Lords of Chaos may refer to:

Lords of Chaos (book), a 1998 book by Michael J. Moynihan and Didrik Søderlind
Lords of Chaos (film), a 2018 film adaptation of the above book
Lords of Chaos (criminal group), a self-styled teen militia
Lords of Chaos (video game), a 1990 video game
"Lords of Chaos", a song by Magnum from the 1978 album Kingdom of Madness
"Lords of Chaos", a song by Job for a Cowboy from the 2009 album Ruination

See also
Lords of Chaos and Order, a fictional group from DC Comics
Lord of Chaos, a 1994 novel by Robert Jordan